Air Tropiques was an airline based in Kinshasa, Democratic Republic of the Congo. It operated domestic, regional and charter flights. Its main base was N'Dolo Airport, Kinshasa.

History
The airline was established in 2001 and started operations in February 2001. It had 50 employees in June 2016 when it was merged into Kin Avia.
The airline was on the List of air carriers banned in the European Union.
Air Tropiques was merged into Kin Avia in June 2016.

Fleet 
The Air Tropiques fleet included the following aircraft (at June 2016):

1 Fokker F27 Mk100 (9Q-CLN) (Standing)
1 Raytheon Beech 1900C Airliner (9Q-CEJ) (Standing without engines)
1 Raytheon Beech Super King Air B200 (ZS-OED)
1 Let-410 UVP (9Q-CEO)
1 Let-410 UVP-E (9Q-CFA)
1 Piper Seneca II (9Q-CSC) (Standing)

See also		
 Transport in the Democratic Republic of the Congo

References

Defunct airlines of the Democratic Republic of the Congo
2001 establishments in the Democratic Republic of the Congo
Airlines established in 2001
2016 disestablishments in the Democratic Republic of the Congo
Airlines disestablished in 2016
Companies based in Kinshasa